Ian Brumby (born 17 September 1964) is an English former professional snooker player.

Career

Born on 17 September 1964, Brumby turned professional in 1989. His first season brought a run to the last 32 at the 1990 Classic, where he defeated Eric Lawlor 5–4, John Spencer 5–1 and benefited from the withdrawal of his last-64 opponent Jimmy White. His last-32 match against Silvino Francisco was a one-sided affair; Francisco beat Brumby 5–0. In qualifying for that year's World Championship, Brumby defeated Bert Demarco and Fred Davis, both 10–6, but was then eliminated by Paddy Browne by the same scoreline.

The following season was barren, Brumby's only notable performance coming in the 1990 International One-Frame Shoot-out, where he beat Matt Gibson, Ian Black, Steve Meakin and Neal Foulds before losing his quarter-final 'match' 29–69 to Jason Whittaker.

Further poor form riddled the early 1990s, but Brumby recorded his first round-of-32 finish at a ranking event in the 1994 International Open; there, opponents included Steve Newbury and Doug Mountjoy, but he exited the tournament with a 1–5 loss to James Wattana.

At the end of the 1993/1994 season, Brumby reached his highest ranking of 69th, and the next season heralded another last-32 finish, at the 1994 Grand Prix, where he beat Michael Judge, Nick Fruin, Drew Henry and Mick Price to set up a meeting with Jimmy Michie. In their match, Michie trailed 1–4, but fought back to win 5–4.

At the 1996 European Open, Brumby again progressed to the last 32 but no further; en route to a match against Dave Harold, he had beaten Martin Dziewialtowski, whitewashed Nick Walker, veteran Cliff Thorburn and Jeff Cundy and overcome another Canadian, Alain Robidoux, but Harold was comfortable in defeating him 5–2.

By 2000, Brumby had slipped to 103rd in the rankings, and a run in the 2000 Scottish Open - again to the last 32, where Marcus Campbell overcame him 5–3 - brought little relief. He was unable to arrest his slide the following season, and lost his place on tour, ranked 136th, in 2001.

Brumby entered qualifying tournaments in the next two years to regain his place, and was successful in his latter attempts. The 2003/2004 season was poor, however, and Brumby again returned to the amateur ranks at its conclusion, aged 39.

Further attempts to re-qualify over the following five years did not come to fruition. As an amateur, he entered two Players Tour Championship events during the 2011/2012 season, losing to Ali Carter and Jimmy White respectively, and latterly reached the fourth qualifying round in the 2015 World Seniors Championship, where Rory McLeod beat him 2–0.

References

English snooker players
1964 births
Sportspeople from London
Living people